Where Twilight Dwells is the debut full-length studio album by the German symphonic/folk metal band Midnattsol. It was released on 31 January 2005 through Napalm Records.

Background 
Where Twilight Dwells is a continuation of their 2003 demo Midnattsol (released only in Germany), from which takes its two songs in form re-recorded and renamed, as well as its ghostly cover art illustrated by Ingo Römling. The rest of the album includes nine previously unreleased and original songs, composed mainly by their lead singer Carmen Elise Espenæs.

The sound is essentially Gothic metal with influences from folk metal, or "Nordic folk metal" in the own words of the band, because of the folk elements in their music and occasional Norwegian lyrics. Their lyrics are largely based on Norwegian folk tales.

The lyrics and main melody of the song "Tapt av håp" are taken from Edvard Grieg's classical piece Solveig's Song.

Track listing

 The songs "Dancing with the Midnight Sun" and "Desolation" are re-recorded and renamed versions of 2003 Midnattsol demo songs "Dancing in the Midnight Sun" and "Desolate".

Personnel

Midnattsol
 Carmen Elise Espenæs – Vocals
 Birgit Öllbrunner – Bass
 Daniel Droste – Guitars, Acoustic Guitars
 Christian Hector – Guitars, Acoustic Guitars, Mouth Harp
 Daniel Fischer – Keyboards
 Chris Merzinsky – Drums

Production
 Alexander Krull - producer, engineering, mixing, mastering
 Martin Schmidt, Mathias Röderer, Thorsten Bauer  - assistant engineers
 Stephan Adolph - keyboards recording engineer
 Birgit Öllbrunner, Chris Merzinsky - mixing
 Fabian Ritter - artwork design and layout
 Daniel Fischer,  Bernd Hector - photography (landscape)
 Katja Piolka - photography (cover)
 Jens Howorka - photography (band)
 Ingo Römling - cover art

References

2005 debut albums
Midnattsol albums
Napalm Records albums
Albums produced by Alexander Krull